Cutaneous diphtheria is an infection of the skin by Corynebacterium diphtheriae.  It is also known as "desert sore".

See also 
 Diphtheria
 Skin lesion

References 

Bacterium-related cutaneous conditions
Diphtheria